Lilli Vincenz is a lesbian activist and the first lesbian member of the gay political activist effort, the Mattachine Society of Washington (MSW).
She served as the editor of the organization's newsletter and in 1969 along with Nancy Tucker created the independent newspaper, the Gay Blade, which later became the Washington Blade.

Vincenz invited women to meet every week at her home during the 1970s to create a safe venue for gay women to discuss gay activism and other lesbian-related issues, and her home became known as the Gay Women's Open House (GWOH).
These meetings became the Gay Women's Alternative.  She described her decision in an interview:

Vincenz was the only self-identified lesbian to participate in the second White House picket with Frank Kameny in 1965. A January 1966 photograph of Vincenz, taken by Kay Lahusen, appeared on the cover of the lesbian magazine The Ladder, making her the first woman with her face showing to do so.

Vincenz made an appearance on PBS' David Susskind Show in 1971, along with six other lesbians, including Barbara Gittings and Barbara Love. They were among the first open lesbians to appear on television in the US, and debated long-held stereotypes about gays with Susskind.

In 2013, her papers, films, and other memorabilia were donated to the Library of Congress.

References

External links
The Lilli M. Vincenz Collection at the Library of Congress includes her documentary films:
The Second Largest Minority (1968)
Gay and Proud (1970)

1937 births
Living people
American LGBT rights activists
Activists from Washington, D.C.
German emigrants to the United States